Ragnhild Abelset (1660-1733), was a Norwegian merchant, landowner and Lensmann.

She married Knud Nilssen Wig, merchant, landowner and Lensmann in Sunnmøre, in 1678. When she was widowed in 1703, she inherited not only his estate and business company, but also his office of Lensmann. She is known as the ancestral mother of several of the most known families of Sunnmøre.

References
 Dale, Bjørn Jonson. (2009, 13. februar). Ragnhild Abelset. I Norsk biografisk leksikon. Hentet 13. august 2017 fra https://nbl.snl.no/Ragnhild_Abelset.

Norwegian landowners
18th-century Norwegian businesswomen
18th-century Norwegian businesspeople
Norwegian merchants
1660 births
1733 deaths
18th-century landowners